This is a list of electoral results for the electoral district of Geelong East in Victorian state elections.

Members for Geelong East

Kernot went on to represent the re-created Geelong from 1877.

Election results

Elections in the 1980s

Elections in the 1970s

References

Victoria (Australia) state electoral results by district